Gakkogawa Dam is a gravity concrete & fill dam (compound) dam located in Yamagata Prefecture in Japan. The dam is used for flood control. The catchment area of the dam is 27.6 km2. The dam impounds about 15  ha of land when full and can store 1780 thousand cubic meters of water. The construction of the dam was started on 1970 and completed in 1978.

References

Dams in Yamagata Prefecture
1978 establishments in Japan